The Bandar Malaysia Utara MRT station (Working name: Bandar Malaysia North) is a planned Mass Rapid Transit (MRT) underground station on the MRT Putrajaya Line. The station will serve the future development of Bandar Malaysia in Salak Selatan, Kuala Lumpur, Malaysia.

Location and construction
The planned station is at the former site of Simpang Airport, close to the intersection of PLUS toll road and Jalan Istana (part of the Besraya toll road). It is one of two stations, the other being Bandar Malaysia Selatan, allocated for the Bandar Malaysia development.

While the Putrajaya Line is completed and will start operations on 16 March 2023, this station along with Bandar Malaysia Utara will not be included in the opening, following the mothballing of the Bandar Malaysia project and the cancellation of the Kuala Lumpur-Singapore high-speed rail project.

References

External links
 Bandar Malaysia North MRT Station | mrt.com.my
 Klang Valley Mass Rapid Transit
 MRT Hawk-Eye View

Rapid transit stations in Kuala Lumpur
Sungai Buloh-Serdang-Putrajaya Line